Germain Gigounon (born 20 April 1989) is a Belgian tennis coach and a former professional player. Gigounon has a career high ATP singles ranking of World No. 185, achieved in August 2015, and a career high ATP doubles ranking of No. 253, achieved in March 2015. Gigounon has won 9 ITF singles titles and 13 ITF doubles titles.

Gigounon made his Grand Slam main draw debut at the 2015 French Open where he qualified for the main draw, defeating Rui Machado, Alexander Kudryavtsev and Alejandro Falla.

As of November 2020, Gigounon is coaching David Goffin. He had previously coached Ysaline Bonaventure and Yanina Wickmayer.

Career finals

Challengers and Futures (14)

References

External links
 
 

1989 births
Living people
Belgian male tennis players
People from Binche
Sportspeople from Hainaut (province)